The Secretaría de Informaciones de Estado (Secretariat of State Information) was an Argentine intelligence agency, created in 1955 by National Executive Decree No. 776 of January 20 during the government of Pedro Eugenio Aramburu. It was the predecessor of the Secretaría de Inteligencia de Estado.

See also
 List of Secretaries of Intelligence
 National Intelligence System
 National Intelligence School
 Directorate of Judicial Surveillance
 National Directorate of Criminal Intelligence
 National Directorate of Strategic Military Intelligence

1955 establishments in Argentina
Defunct Argentine intelligence agencies